Maria Fernanda Tapia Canovi (born June 23, 1965) is a Mexican announcer, presenter, producer, screenwriter, lecturer, singer, and voice actress.

Career

Announcer
As a radio announcer, host, and voice actress, Fernanda Tapia has contributed to programs and projects such as the Rock 101 shows La Odisea Del Emisario, Hablemos de hombres, Cáigase de la cama, La media naranja, El tianguis de Fernanda, La Talacha, La Pantera, Sabrosita 590, Espacio 59, Radio Alicia, Radioactivo 98.5, La Revista del Consumidor, Entre lo público y lo privado (together with Andrés Roemer), and Las del estribo. She also has a podcast titled El Tao at Prodigy.msn.com, and another at Dixo.com. As of November 5, 2012, she is the director and announcer of the Triple W radio program through W Radio, which is broadcast Monday through Friday from 1:00 p.m. to 3:00 p.m.

Presenter
Tapia is currently the presenter of the programs  on cable television network 52MX, Juntas, ni difuntas with Mariana H. and Laura García on Proyecto 40, Hoy Te Toca with Paulina Mercado, and Diálogos en Confianza on Canal Once.

Columnist
She has worked in media since the age of 32, on magazines such as Reporte Indigo and El Huevo, as well as newspapers such as El Centro, El Financiero, La Jornada, Publimetro, and UNOMÁSUNO. However, as she has clarified on several occasions, she is not a journalist, since she does not have the training or studies that would qualify her as such.

Writer
Tapia has published four books, beginning in 2004 with El sexo y otros cuentos de hadas (Sex and Other Fairy Tales). The second, 2008's Sueños (Dreams), is a collection of dreams of politicians, actors, and friends, written with the participation of Dr. Marco Campuzano, and presented by Horacio Franco, Marisol Gasé, Humberto Vélez, Juan Alarcón, Ana Francis Mor, and Gustavo Munguía. In 2011 she launched her third book, Tampoco se trata de ser perfectas (Nor is it a Question of Being Perfect), which includes a series of confessions made by women from different backgrounds. In 2012 she contributed the epilogue to El bestiario político del Almohadazo (The Political Bestiary of El Almohadazo), developed by the writers of El Almohadazo and coordinated by the program's head of information, showing the political fauna of the country.

Screenwriter
She has written several comic scripts and sketches for Eugenio Derbez, Leonorilda Ochoa, Víctor Trujillo, Ausencio Cruz, Héctor Suárez, and David Patiño, among others.

Dubbing
Fernanda Tapia has dubbed such well-known characters as Mary Alice Young in Desperate Housewives, Janet Darling on Clarissa Explains It All, and Mirage in the animated film The Incredibles.

Voice in films

Voice in series

Recognition

 1990: Named Locutora de la Decada (Announcer of the Decade) by the newspaper El Financiero
 1999: 
 2001: Pagés Llergo Prize for the program Diálogos en Confianza, which she presented
 2002: First place in the Radio Biennial in the category "Promotional Radio Station Identification"
 2002: Named Best Female Booth Announcer by Voces magazine
 2003: Prize for Best Medical Journalism for the Diálogos en Confianza episode "Esquizofrenia" (Schizophrenia)
 2003: AMPRYT Prize for Best Television Program Content for the whole crew of Diálogos en Confianza
 2004: Emmanuel Haro Villa Award for Featured Journalists from the Association of Theatrical Journalists
 2004: Golden Laurel of Mexican-Spanish Quality for the program Diálogos en Confianza
 2008: Named a Woman of the Year as part of International Women's Day

Personal life
Tapia is an adherent to BDSM and was on Amordidas and interviewed by Silvia Olmedo, where she demonstrated, to the shock of many viewers, how to be whipped.

References

External links
 
 

1965 births
Living people
Mexican people of Italian descent
Mexican television presenters
Mexican voice actresses
Mexican women screenwriters
Mexican radio presenters
Mexican women radio presenters
Mexican women television presenters
Universidad Tecnológica de México alumni